Al-Rahabi or Rahabis is an Arab clan. It is a branch of the Taghlib tribe. Al-Rahabi are cousins with the tribe of Anizzah, Rahba and Khabur and the cities of Abu Kamal and Asharah, and a large section in Iraq in Anbar and Tikrit, and the rest scattered in Gulf Arab states, an estimated 380,000 people. Prince Malik ibn Tauk (791–874 AD) is the founder of the clan.

Banu Taghlib
Tribes of Arabia
Syrian families
Arabs in Syria